Siebmachers Wappenbuch is a roll of arms first published in 1605 as two heraldic multivolume book series of armorial bearings or coats of arms of the nobility of the Holy Roman Empire, as well as coats of arms of city-states and some burgher families. Founded and compiled by Johann Ambrosius Siebmacher (1561 – 23 March 1611), a German heraldic artist, copperplate engraver, etcher and publisher from Nuremberg, these works became an important source of heraldry of the German-speaking regions.

The Old Siebmacher
The Alter Siebmacher was compiled 1605–1806, and represents the contemporary heraldry during the final two centuries of the Holy Roman Empire. 
Its two volumes were completed by Johann Siebmacher. His work was continued to six volumes with additional supplements by Paul Fürst, Wolfgang Gottlieb Fürst, Rudolf Johann Helmers, Christoph Weigel the Elder and Gabriel Nikolaus Raspe. The supplemented works were also published under the titles of their respective publishers, such as: Fürstsches Wappenbuch, Helmersches Wappenbuch, Weigelsches Wappenbuch or Raspes Wappenbuch.

The New Siebmacher 
The Neuer Siebmacher, Siebmachers großes und allgemeines Wappenbuch was compiled 1854-1967  by Adolf Matthias Hildebrandt, Maximilian Gritzner, and Gustav A Seyler. The General-Index of the whole work has been edited by Hanns Jäger-Sunstenau. 
Later Ottfried Neubecker had published all burgher arms of the New Siebmacher without the text as a sort of illustrated glossary organized by the heraldic charges.

See also 
 German heraldry

References

External links
 On line version of Johann Siebmachers Wappenbuch von 1605
 Supplement volume to the New Siebmacher - Gründsätze der Wappenkunst verbunden mit einem Handbuch der heraldischen Terminologie by Maximilian Gritzner
Annotated Heraldry Bibliography by François Velde about Siebmacher
 Original 17th Century B&W version Johann Siebmachers Wappenbuch. Contains six volumes, 1,200 pages, 16,000 names, completely cross-referenced; thousands of corrections to the original Index.
 Index of Siebmacher's Armorials - The database contains the family names and titles (more than 137,000 entries) of the General-Index zu den Siebmacherschen Wappenbüchern 1605-1967 (General Index of Siebmacher’s Armorials 1605–1967).

Heraldic artists
Heraldry of the Holy Roman Empire
Rolls of arms
Literature on heraldry
1605 establishments in the Holy Roman Empire